The Law Book of Žilina from 1378–1561 is a medieval law book of Žilina. The book contains a text of Magdeburg Law, its translation to mixed Slovak–Czech language and various law act records in German, Latin and Slovak–Czech.

Žilina was originally governed by the law brought from Polish Cieszyn where was also the court of appeal. In 1364, Cziesyn adopted so-called Magdeburg Law. This was probably an impulse for Louis I of Hungary who warned Žilina that it should not appeal to the foreign court, but it should choose some town in the Kingdom of Hungary governed by the Magdeburg Law.
Then, Žilina received the text of the law from Krupina. The original German text of the law was translated in 1473 by Václav of Kroměříž on request of a hereditary reeve of Žilina Václav Pankrác of Svätý Mikuláš, Branč and Strečno.

The book is an important resource for linguistic research of old Slovak and old Czech. The translation of  Magdeburg Law and later law acts records were intended for the Slovak burgesses and members of the town council, so it contains a lot of contemporary Slovak lexemes and terminological or non-terminological idioms.

References

Language
Slovak
Slovak language
Slovak literature